was a Japanese freestyle wrestler who won a gold medal at the 1956 Olympics. Later he worked as a wrestling coach.

References

External links
 

1935 births
2002 deaths
Olympic wrestlers of Japan
Wrestlers at the 1956 Summer Olympics
Japanese male sport wrestlers
Olympic gold medalists for Japan
Olympic medalists in wrestling
Medalists at the 1956 Summer Olympics
20th-century Japanese people